The 1946 Southern California Conference football season was the season of college football played by the five member schools of the Southern California Conference (SCC) as part of the 1946 college football season.

The Redlands Bulldogs won the SCC championship with a 4–2–2 record (2–0–2 against conference opponents).

Conference overview

Teams

Redlands

The 1946 Redlands Bulldogs football team that represented the University of Redlands of Redlands, California. In their 14th season under head coach Cecil A. Cushman, the team compiled a 4–2–2 record (2–0–2 against SCC opponents). Ed Hales and Jim Verdieck were assistant coaches.

Nine Redlands players received first- or second-team honors on the 1946 All-Southern California Athletic Conference football team: back J. Lloyd (1st); end Homer Richards (1st); center John Hoffman (1st); tackle Keith Broader (1st); back Ted Runner (2nd); end Stan Flowers (2nd); end Pete Masonis (2nd); guard Mack Hammond (2nd); and guard Ted Duncan (2nd).

The team played its home games at Orange Show Stadium in San Bernardino, California.

Whittier

The 1946 Whittier Poets football team that represented Whittier College of Whittier, California. In their 15th season under head coach Wallace Newman, the team compiled a 3–5–1 record (2–1–1 against SCC opponents), finished in second place in the SCC, and were outscored by a total of 114 to 83.

Pomona

The 1946 Pomona Sagehens football team that represented Pomona College of Pomona, California. In their 10th season under head coach Earl J. Merritt, the Sagehens compiled a 1–5–2 record (1–1–2 against SCC opponents), finished in third place in the SCC, and were outscored by a total of 124 to 56.

Occidental

The 1946 Occidental Tigers football team that represented Occidental College of Los Angeles, California. In their 10th season under head coach Roy Dennis, the Tigers compiled a 1–4–2 record (1–2–1 against SCC opponents), finished in fourth place in the SCC, and were outscored by a total of 73 to 44.

Caltech

The 1946 Caltech Beavers football team that represented the California Institute of Technology of Pasadena, California. Led by third-year head coach Mason Anderson, the Beavers compiled a 2–4 record (1–3 against SCC opponents), finished in last place in the SCC, and were outscored by a total of 110 to 86.

References